Sibinj Krmpotski is a village in Croatia. It is connected by the D8 highway and is part of the group of villages called Krmpote.

References

Populated places in Primorje-Gorski Kotar County